Ghetto Dreams is the debut solo studio album by American rapper Fat Pat of Screwed Up Click. It was released on March 17, 1998 through Wreckshop Records, making it his first posthumous release following his death on February 4, 1998. Recording sessions took place at J2 Recording Studio in his hometown of Houston, Texas. Production was handled by Double D, Noke D, Sean "Solo" Jemison, Prowler, Big Swift and J Slash, with D-Reck serving as executive producer. It features guest appearances from Big Hawk, Big Moe, Big Pokey, Big Steve, Billy Cook, C-Note, Corey-B, Double D, Lil' Keke, Mike D, Ronnie Spencer, Sean Pymp & Tyte Eyes. The album peaked at number 39 on the US Billboard Top R&B/Hip-Hop Albums and number 19 on the Top Heatseekers, supported by a single "Tops Drop", which made it to #10 on the Bubbling Under Hot 100.

Track listing

Charts

References

External links

1998 debut albums
Fat Pat (rapper) albums
Albums published posthumously